The Miss Ecuador 2003 was on March 27, 2003. There were 11 candidates for the national title. The previous winner, Isabel Ontaneda from Pichincha, crown her successor, Andrea Jácome from Guayas as Miss Ecuador 2003. She competed at Miss Universe 2003.

Results

Placements

Special awards

Contestants

Casting

A casting was held in 2003 to select an Ecuadorian representative to compete at Miss Earth 2003.

Notes

Returns

Last compete in:

2000
 Imbabura

Withdraws

 Manabí

External links
http://www.eluniverso.com/2003/03/16/0001/257/C9DF7F5C65CE4A93AE73A0C89B00FC35.html
https://web.archive.org/web/20060504031208/http://www.missecuador.net/exreinas/2000.htm
http://www.explored.com.ec/noticias-ecuador/miss-ecuador-con-once-candidatas-140552-140552.html
http://www.eluniverso.com/2003/03/29/0001/257/596C7321EEFA40D896637F585C75D50D.html

Miss Ecuador
2003 beauty pageants
2003 in Ecuador
Beauty pageants in Ecuador